The Seth Peterson Cottage is a two-room lakeside cottage located in Mirror Lake State Park outside Lake Delton, Wisconsin, United States. It was designed by Frank Lloyd Wright in 1958.

History
Wisconsin resident Seth Peterson convinced Wright, who was then 90 years old, to design a cottage for him in 1958. Peterson killed himself before the cottage was finished, and the next owners completed the work. Mirror Lake State Park was established nearby in 1962, and in 1966 the land on which the cottage stood was acquired by the state and added to the park.  Away from the developed areas of the park, however, the cottage was neglected and fell into disrepair.  In the late 1980s Audrey Laatsch, a local resident, noticed the run-down cabin while canoeing on Mirror Lake and became interested in the structure.  Upon discovering its origin, she spearheaded a grass-roots campaign among local residents and Wright-aficionados to restore the cottage.  They founded a non-profit organization, the Seth Peterson Cottage Conservancy, in 1989.  Their efforts funded a $300,000, three-year restoration that included elements from Wright's original designs that had never been built.  The work was finished in June 1992, the 125th anniversary of Wright's birth.

The plight of the condition of the cottage was made widely known via a 1986 Wisconsin State Journal article entitled "What Would You Do If You Owned a Frank Lloyd Wright House? P.S. You Do." While the cottage had been known to locals, this article publicized the embarrassing condition of the cottage and possibly energized the movement to rehabilitate it. The article was written by author Joyce Rogell Kult, a long-time Wright aficionado, researcher, and artist.

Visiting

The cottage can accommodate up to four overnight guests, up to twelve for a meeting, and 30-40 for an event. The cottage is also opened for a public tour on the second Sunday of every month.

References

 Storrer, William Allin. The Frank Lloyd Wright Companion. University Of Chicago Press, 2006,  (S.430)

External links
Seth Peterson Cottage website
Mirror Lake State Park website

Houses in Sauk County, Wisconsin
Frank Lloyd Wright buildings
Houses completed in 1958
Houses on the National Register of Historic Places in Wisconsin
Tourist attractions in Sauk County, Wisconsin
National Register of Historic Places in Sauk County, Wisconsin